The Hafeziyeh Stadium is a multi-purpose stadium in Shiraz, Iran.  It is currently used mostly for football matches and is the home stadium of Persian Gulf League side, Fajr Sepasi F.C. The stadium also is used for some matches of Bargh Shiraz F.C. in Azadegan League. The stadium holds 20,000 people and is all-seater. The stadium was the host venue of 2012 Hazfi Cup Final. The stadium is located in the Center of Shiraz in the Hafezieh district, near the Tomb of Hafez and is easily accessible for most people living in the city.

Background

In 1940, Iran's then Prime Minister Mohammad-Ali Foroughi visited Shiraz and proposed a project for Shiraz to make a bid for holding the 1976 AFC Asian Cup with Shiraz as second host city. The operation of the venue was officially begun on 1 March 1945 and after near ten months, the stadium was opened in January 1946. The opening match was between Bargh Shiraz and CD Castellón in a friendly match, held on 20 January 1946 which Bargh won 1-0. 

Hafezieh stadium has been renovated twice, firstly in 1972 to make venue ready for the Asian Cup, which later was cancelled when Tabriz's Bagh Shomal Stadium was made second host because of its greater capacity. The second renovation began in 2009 and the capacity of the venue was upgraded from 20,000 to 22,000 seated.

Notable matches
The match between Fajr Sepasi and Bargh Shiraz in 2001–02 Iran Pro League was named the Shiraz's most attendance match with a 20,984 fans watching the match. It was the first Shiraz derby which was Fajr won. The stadium also held four Hazfi Cup finals. The first was during 2000–01 Hazfi Cup. Fajr faced Zob Ahan and won the first leg 1-0 in Isfahan. The second leg was held in Hafezieh and Fajr won 2-1, leading to winning the title for the first time. Fajr was also a finalist in the 2001–02 Hazfi Cup, faced Esteghlal in first leg in Shiraz. It ended with a 2-1 win for Esteghlal which helped them win the title with a 2-2 draw in second leg. Fajr also qualified to the final of 2002–03 Hazfi Cup, another final with Zob Ahan but it was a loss for Fajr. The first leg held in Isfahan & they draw(2-2),The second leg was in hafezie stadium & again they draw(2-2) but one of them should win that match so in penalties Zob Ahan won(6-5). The final of the 2011–12 Hazfi Cup was also held at this stadium but Fajr wasn't a finalist. Esteghlal beat Shahin Bushehr 4-1 on penalties on 15 March 2012 in a single match.

Balloon Festival

On the occasion of the Shiraz week, 12 hot air balloon flew at the same time across the city for the first time in Shiraz. The ceremony was held in two stages. First in sunset and other in night. After the end of the night ceremony, the floodlight was held in Hafezieh Stadium.

Renovation
After the criticisms about 2012 Hazfi Cup finals held in Hafezieh because of bad grass at winter, the grass of the stadium was improved for the start of the 2012 Iran Pro League season.

See also
List of association football stadia by capacity
Football in Iran
Azadi Stadium
Shiraz Stadium

References

External links
Fajr Sepasi F.C.

Buildings and structures completed in 1946
Sport in Shiraz
Football venues in Iran
Multi-purpose stadiums in Iran
Buildings and structures in Shiraz
Bargh Shiraz F.C.